Sylvia Haydée Kersenbaum (born 27 December 1941) is an Argentine pianist, composer and teacher. Among other things, she is recognized for performing the complete cycle of 32 Beethoven piano sonatas twice (in 1989–1990 and 2003–2004), and her music for the ballet The Masque of the Red Death, based on a story by Edgar Allan Poe.

Life 
Silvia Kersenbaum was born in Buenos Aires, Argentina on 27 December 1941, to an Austrian father and Italian mother. She began her musical studies at four years of age with her mother, and she started learning to play the piano before her feet could reach the pedals. She later studied with Angélica C. de Roldan and then enrolled in the Conservatorio Nacional Superior de Música (National Superior Music Conservatory) with the most renowned piano teacher in Argentina, Vincenzo Scaramuzza. She debuted in Buenos Aires in 1958 with Beethoven's Piano Concerto No. 1, receiving high acclaim. In 1966 she was awarded a scholarship by the Italian Government to study at the Accademia Nazionale di Santa Cecilia (National Academy of Santa Cecilia) in Rome, where she worked under the tutelage of Carlo Zecchi. She also studied at the Accademia Musicale Chigiana in Siena and with Nikita Magaloff in Geneva.

The Zürich newspaper Unterhaltungs Blätter said of her: "It is remarkable the number of young and qualified Argentine artists in recent years who conquered the European public. After Argerich, Gelber, Barenboin, you must add the name of Sylvia Kersenbaum, who in her debut in Zurich was a resounding success."

She has toured in East Asia, Europe, New Zealand, the United States and Mexico.  She has recorded music of Beethoven, Chopin, Brahms, Paganini, Tchaikovsky, Liszt, Weber, Mendelssohn, Schubert, Granados, Glinka, Schumann, Franck, Scriabin, Berg, Mozart, Ginastera, Rachmaninoff, Bach, Grieg, Dohnányi, Falla, Gershwin, Hindemith, Haydn, Janáček, Piazzolla, Ravel and Strauss.

In 1976, she moved to Kentucky to join the Department of Music at Western Kentucky University, where in 1990, she was awarded the top prize and serves as professor emerita. While living in Kentucky, she spent over two decades as harpist of the Bowling Green Western Symphony Orchestra.

Work 
As a composer her highlights include choral works (two a cappella suites for choir and a cantata for soprano, tenor, choir and orchestra) and music for the ballet The Masque of the Red Death, based on Edgar Allan Poe's story by the same name and released by the Capitol Arts Center of Bowling Green, Kentucky in 2001.

She has written several arrangements for piano, including "Bacchanale" from Camille Saint-Saëns' Samson and Delilah, "Träume" by Richard Wagner, "Cambalache" by Enrique Santos Discépolo, and "Bénédiction de Dieu dans la solitude" by Franz Liszt for cello and piano.

Prizes and Recognitions 
 Honorary member of the American Beethoven Society after playing the cycle of the 32 Beethoven sonatas in 1990.
 Western Kentucky University Faculty Award for Research and Creativity (1990). In 2003, the university established a scholarship in her name.
 Records and Recording Record of the Year.
 In 1999 she obtained the Konex Merit Diploma for piano alongside Martha Argerich, Bruno Leonardo Gelber, Nelson Goerner and Manuel Rego. She was recognized as the most excellent interpreter of the last decade. 
 Named "Best Instrumental Performer" by the Music Critics Association of Argentina in 2004.
 Included in the collection "100 Virtuosi of the 20th Century" by EMI for her version of the Liszt's "Hexameron".
 Received a Lifetime Award at Western Kentucky University during May 2020

References 

1945 births
Argentine classical pianists
Argentine women pianists
Argentine people of Austrian-Jewish descent
Argentine people of Italian descent
Women classical pianists
Living people
Jewish classical pianists
Musicians from Buenos Aires
Argentine harpists
Western Kentucky University faculty
Kentucky women musicians
21st-century classical pianists
Accademia Nazionale di Santa Cecilia alumni
American women academics
21st-century American women
21st-century women pianists